New Palestine High School is a rural public high school (grades 9–12) located in New Palestine, Indiana, managed by the Community School Corporation of Southern Hancock County. As of the 2016–2017 school year it serves 1,137 students and employed 61 faculty members.

New Palestine High School has repeatedly been named a Four-Star School by the Indiana Department of Education. In 2012, it was named a National Blue Ribbon School by the United States Department of Education.

Athletics and extracurricular activities
New Palestine High School is part of the Hoosier Heritage Conference and offers soccer, tennis, cross country, American football, golf, volleyball, basketball, gymnastics, swimming, wrestling, baseball, softball and track and field. In addition, New Palestine High School has award-winning marching band, choir and journalism programs.

New Palestine has won nine Indiana High School Athletic Association state championships: in baseball (2004), softball (2004, 2008, 2009, 2017, 2018, 2019), and football (2014, 2018, 2019). In addition, the Dragons have had State Finals appearances in baseball (2003, 2004), softball (2003, 2004, 2006, 2008, 2009, 2017, 2018) and football (1990, 2014, 2015, 2018, 2019), as well as team state finals appearances in golf and gymnastics. NPHS also has eight individual IHSAA state championships, won by Kyle Ulrey (1), Chad Red (4) and Alec White (1) in wrestling, as well as Lori Swegman (1, 880 yard run) and Samuel Voelz (1, 800 meter run) in track and field.

A former football coach, Marvin Shepler, is a member of the Indiana Football Hall of Fame and a former basketball coach, Fred Keesling, is a member of the Indiana Basketball Hall of Fame, and the IHSAA's Mental Attitude Award for boys' golf is named for him. Former football player, Todd Yoder, was also inducted in the Indiana Football Hall of Fame in 2015.

Notable graduates 
 Angela Ahrendts, senior vice president, retail and online stores, Apple Inc.; former CEO of Burberry
 Todd Yoder, former professional football player
 Kent Raymond, former professional basketball player
 Patrick Feeney, former professional track athlete

References

External links
 New Palestine High School website
 PublicSchoolReview
 New Palestine Sports
 List of high schools in Indiana
 Hoosier Heritage Conference

קeמןs

Public high schools in Indiana
Schools in Hancock County, Indiana
1919 establishments in Indiana